Ian Bryant (born 1965) is a British academic, engaged in promoting Trustworthy Software, and in Standardisation.

Current roles
Ian Bryant currently is best known for his roles in promoting Trustworthy Software (currently for the Trustworthy Software Foundation), but also has roles as:

 Adjunct Faculty at University of Warwick Cyber Security Centre (CSC)
 Adjunct Faculty at De Montfort University Cyber Security Centre (CSC)
 Standards Coherence, predominantly with the British Standards Institution (BSI) and its international linked SDO (Standards Development Organisations):
 BSI IST/033 – Expert Committee on Information Security (UK shadow for ISO/IEC JTC1 SC27), where he is Chair of Sub-committee IST/033/4 (Controls and Services; UK shadow for ISO/IEC JTC1 SC27 WG4)
 BSI IST/015 – Expert Committee on Systems and Software Engineering (UK shadow for ISO/IEC JTC1 SC7) 
 BSI IST/038 – Expert Committee on Distributed Application Processes and Services (UK shadow for ISO/IEC JTC1 SC38) 
 BSI ICT/00-/09 - Chair of Project Committee for BS10754 series on Trustworthy Systems (replacing British Standards (BS) Publicly Available Specification (PAS) 754)

Early and personal life
Ian Bryant was educated at Taunton School in Somerset, and the University of Leicester where he studied Engineering.

Career
Ian Bryant has been a Professional Engineer employed by HM Government for much of his career, either as a technical specialist and/or project manager, with assignments spanning a variety of organisations, including Cabinet Office, MOD, National Archives, National Policing, and the former National Infrastructure Security Coordination Centre (now CPNI).

He has been involved with "Cyber Security" (and its various predecessor terms) since the 1980s, in a variety of roles including Investigation / Incident Response, Security Architecture, Systems Accreditation, Research and Technology Management, and Policy Development.

His work on Trustworthy Software originated with leading the original Cabinet Office (CSIA) study on Secure Software Development (SSD), then being the Technical Manager for the Pilot Operation of the CSIA (now CESG) Claims Tested Mark (CCT Mark) Scheme.  Subsequently, he contributed to the Technology Strategy Board (TSB) Cyber Security Knowledge Transfer Network (CSKTN) Special Interest Group (SIG) on Secure Software Development, and latterly lead the Secure Software Development Partnership's (SSDP) SIG on Standards before the formalisation of the Software Security, Dependability and Resilience Initiative (SSDRI – the original name for TSI) in July 2011.

He also developed and launched the IT Security Awareness for Everyone (ITSafe) service—now part of GetSafeOnline and helped found the National Information Assurance Forum (NIAF – formerly "GIPSI") which he now Co-Chairs.

Recent research activity includes leading a NATO Research Task Group (RTG), and being the lead Information Security specialist for the European Commission (EC) funded MS3i and NEISAS Projects.

References

Living people
Academics of De Montfort University
Academics of the University of Warwick
British computer scientists
People educated at Taunton School
Alumni of the University of Leicester
1965 births